The World RX of Great Britain is a Rallycross event held in the United Kingdom for the FIA World Rallycross Championship. The event made its debut in the 2014 season, at the Lydden Hill Race Circuit in the village of Wootton, Kent near Dover. From 2018, the event moved and is now hosted at Silverstone Circuit.

Past winners

References

External links 

Great Britain
Auto races in the United Kingdom